Halim (Arabic: حليم) is the second solo album by the Belgian world music singer Natacha Atlas. It was released by Nation Records in 1997. The album was primarily produced by Transglobal Underground and John Reynolds.

The album is dedicated to Egyptian singer Abdel Halim Hafez, whose "music meant everything" to her.

Critical reception
AllMusic wrote that Atlas "continues in her vein of excellent Arabic singing combined with a wide variety of musical traditions, modern and ancient."

Track listing
All tracks written and composed by Natacha Atlas, Count Dubulah, Hamid ManTu and Alex Kasiek, except where stated.

 "Marifnaash" (Atlas, John Reynolds, Justin Adams) – 4:49
 "Moustahil" – 3:33
 "Amulet" – 4:59
 "Leyli" – 3:42
 "Kidda" (Atlas, Reynolds, Adams) – 5:10
 "Sweeter Than Any Sweets" – 6:00
 "Ya Weledi" – 7:10
 "Enogoom Wil, Amar" (Atlas) – 6:45
 "Andeel" (Atlas) – 5:56
 "Gafsa" (Atlas, Reynolds, Adams) – 6:37
 "Ya Albi Ehda" (Atlas, Essam Rashad) – 9:00
 "Agib" (Atlas, Reynolds, Adams) – 7:34

Bonus tracks
All bonus tracks appear on the special edition Halim.
 "L'Égyptienne" featuring Les Négresses Vertes (Atlas, Matthias Canavese, Stéfane Mellino, Michel Ochowiak) – 3:28
 "Duden" (Spooky remix) (Atlas, Dubulah, ManTu, Ahlan) – 6:59

Personnel
The following people contributed to Halim:

Natacha Atlas – vocals
Sawt El Atlas – backing vocals
Carol Isaacs – accordion
Count Dubulah – bass, guitar, programming, string arrangements
John Reynolds – drums, bass, keyboards
Hamid Mantu – drums, dulcimer, programming
Tim Garsaayid – dharabuka, riq, ney
Jaz Coleman – keyboards
Nick Walker – programming

Caroline Dale – cello, string arrangements
Rony Barak – dharabuka, riqq, daf
Justin Adams – guitar
Alex Kasiek – keyboards, lute, backing vocals, programming, string arrangements
Lazarus Whelan – keyboards, saxophone, ney, clarinet
Keith Clouston – oud
Simon Walker – violin, viola
Ahmed Mansour, Nawazish Khan, Wa'el Abubakr, Aboud Abdel Al – violin
Arabella Rodriquez, David White, Ott, Zakaria, Konstantine – engineering

Charts

References

External links
Official website

1997 albums
Natacha Atlas albums
Nation Records albums